Onthophagus laevigatus, is a species of dung beetle found in India, and Sri Lanka.

Description
This oval, and less convex species has an average length of about 6 to 9 mm. Body black and opaque. Head, pronotum, and the ventrum shiny. Antennae and mouthparts reddish and covered with scanty reddish setae in ventrum and legs. Head broad and short. Clypeus with a broadly rounded margin. Pronotum unevenly punctured. Elytra finely striate, with flat intervals and minutely and irregularly granular. Pygidium opaque with few minute punctures. Male has shiny clypeus which is finely rugosely punctured whereas female has closely transversely rugose clypeus.

References 

Scarabaeinae
Insects of India
Beetles of Sri Lanka
Insects described in 1798